Foreston is a city in Mille Lacs County, Minnesota,  United States.  The population was 533 at the 2010 census.

History
A post office called Foreston has been in operation since 1889. The city was named for the forests near the original town site.

Geography
Minnesota Highway 23 serves as a main route in the community.

Transportation
  MN 23
  Mille Lacs County Road 14
  Mille Lacs County Road 18

Demographics

2010 census
As of the census of 2010, there were 533 people, 202 households, and 135 families residing in the city. The racial makeup of the city was 96.2% White, 1.1% Native American, 0.8% Asian, 0.2% from other races, and 1.7% from two or more races. Hispanic or Latino of any race were 1.7% of the population.

There were 202 households, of which 37.1% had children under the age of 18 living with them, 49.5% were married couples living together, 10.4% had a female householder with no husband present, 6.9% had a male householder with no wife present, and 33.2% were non-families. 23.8% of all households were made up of individuals, and 5.5% had someone living alone who was 65 years of age or older. The average household size was 2.64 and the average family size was 3.06.

The median age in the city was 31.3 years. 28.1% of residents were under the age of 18; 8.8% were between the ages of 18 and 24; 33.1% were from 25 to 44; 21.9% were from 45 to 64; and 8.1% were 65 years of age or older. The gender makeup of the city was 52.0% male and 48.0% female.

2000 census
As of the census of 2000, there were 389 people, 145 households, and 95 families residing in the city. The racial makeup of the city was 99.74% White, 0.26% from other races. Hispanic or Latino of any race were 0.51% of the population.

There were 145 households, out of which 36.6% had children under the age of 18 living with them, 52.4% were married couples living together, 9.0% had a female householder with no husband present, and 33.8% were non-families. 24.1% of all households were made up of individuals, and 12.4% had someone living alone who was 65 years of age or older.  The average household size was 2.68 and the average family size was 3.26.

In the city, the population was spread out, with 29.6% under the age of 18, 11.1% from 18 to 24, 32.4% from 25 to 44, 17.5% from 45 to 64, and 9.5% who were 65 years of age or older.  The median age was 31 years. For every 100 females, there were 122.3 males.  For every 100 females age 18 and over, there were 124.6 males.

The median income for a household in the city was $37,500, and the median income for a family was $45,625. Males had a median income of $30,625 versus $26,071 for females. The per capita income for the city was $16,666.  5.7% of the population and 1.0% of families were below the poverty line.   3.5% of those under the age of 18 and 14.6% of those 65 and older were living below the poverty line.

References

Cities in Minnesota
Cities in Mille Lacs County, Minnesota